The Macon Chronicle-Herald was a daily newspaper published in Macon, Missouri, United States. It began publishing in 1910 as the Daily Chronicle. As of 2014, was owned by GateHouse Media. It stopped publishing on July 30, 2014.

From 1925 to 1973, the newspaper was owned by Frank P. Briggs, a Democrat who served as mayor and a member of the Missouri State Senate, and who succeeded Harry S. Truman in the United States Senate.

At the end of July, Lewis County Press, which owns the Macon County Home Press, a weekly Macon County newspaper, bought the assets of the 104-year-old Chronicle-Herald from Gatehouse Media Inc., which filed for bankruptcy protection in the fall of 2013.

References

External links 
 
 GateHouse Media

Newspapers published in Missouri
Macon County, Missouri
Newspapers established in 1910
1910 establishments in Missouri
Publications disestablished in 2014
2014 disestablishments in Missouri